Joshua Donen (born 1955) is an American film producer. He is the son of director Stanley Donen and actress Marion Marshall.

Donen dated singer and actress Cher from 1984 to 1986.

Work
The Quick and the Dead (1995)
Underneath (1995; executive producer)
The Great White Hype (1996)
Armored (2009)
Drag Me to Hell (2009; executive producer)
Spartacus: Blood and Sand (2010; executive producer)
Oz the Great and Powerful (2013)
House of Cards (2013; executive producer)
Mindhunter (2017; executive producer)
Love, Death & Robots (2019)
Voir (2021; executive producer)

References

External links

Living people
1955 births
American film producers
Primetime Emmy Award winners
American people of German-Jewish descent
American people of Russian-Jewish descent